is a junction railway station in the city of Ninohe, Iwate, Japan, operated by JR East for the Tohoku Shinkansen and the third-sector railway operator Iwate Ginga Railway Company for local services.

Lines
It is also a station on the Iwate Ginga Railway Line, and is 70.8 kilometers from the terminus of that line  at Morioka Station.

Station layout
The JR East Ninohe Station has two elevated opposed side platforms, with the station building located underneath. The platforms have chest-high platform edge doors, and the tracks are covered with a roof to form a snow shelter. The station has a Midori no Madoguchi staffed ticket office.

The adjacent Iwate Ginga Railway Station has a ground level island platform and a single side platform connected to the three-story station building by an overhead crossing. The station is staffed.

Platforms
 

 
   

Some Shinkansen trains pass this station.

Connecting bus routes

 JR Bus Tohoku
 For Morioka Station via Jōbōji and Araya-Shinmachi Station (Highway Bus "Super Yuyu")
 For Kuji Station (Tohoku Shinkansen Relay Bus "Swallow")
 For Kintaichi-Onsen Station, Kintaichi Onsen (Kintaichi Hot Spring) and Karumai Hospital
 For Jōbōji
 For Ichinohe Station
 For Kuzumaki via Ichinohe Station and Kozuya Station
 Iwate Kenpoku Bus
 For Ibonai

History
It was renamed  on 1 June 1921, and Ninohe Station on 1 February 1987. The station was absorbed into the JR East network upon the privatization of the Japanese National Railways (JNR) on 1 April 1987, and was transferred to the Iwate Ginga Railway on 1 September 2002. Services on the Tohoku Shinkansen commenced 1 December 2002.

Passenger statistics
In fiscal 2018, the JR East portion of the station was used by an average of 788 passengers daily (boarding passengers only). The Iwate Ginga Railway portion of the station was used by an average of 721 passengers daily.

Surrounding area 
 JR Bus Tōhoku Ninohe Bus office
 Ninohe Police station
 Ninohe City office Ishikiri branch office
 Ninohe Post office
 Iwate prefectural Fukuoka industry senior high school

See also
 List of Railway Stations in Japan

References

External links

 Ninohe Station (JR East) 
 Ninohe Station (Iwate Ginga Railway) 

Railway stations in Iwate Prefecture
Tōhoku Shinkansen
Iwate Galaxy Railway Line
Railway stations in Japan opened in 1891
Ninohe, Iwate